Walter Bailey is former state prosecutor and current member a member of the town council for Summerville, South Carolina.  He represents the town's third district.  In late July and early August 2010, he proposed and successfully passed a town ordinance that effectively bars illegal aliens from living or working in the town.

Prior to running for town council, Bailey was the first circuit solicitor for South Carolina. He was assigned the Charleston Five case after the state Attorney General, Charlie Condon removed himself as the prosecutor.

References

External links
http://www.huffingtonpost.com/2010/08/12/south-carolina-town-moves_n_679782.html

Immigration law
American prosecutors
South Carolina city council members
Living people
People from Summerville, South Carolina
Year of birth missing (living people)